Rhinotia hemisticta is a species of weevil in the family Belidae, commonly referred to as the long-nosed weevil, or long nosed weevil.

It was first described by Ernst Friedrich Germar  in 1848 as Belus hemistictus.

References

Belidae
Beetles of Australia
Beetles described in 1848